Kharkovka is a rural locality (a selo) and the administrative center of Kharkovskoye Rural Settlement, Staropoltavsky District, Volgograd Oblast, Russia. The population was 920 as of 2010. There are 16 streets.

Geography 
Kharkovka is located in steppe, on the Caspian Depression, 31 km southeast of Staraya Poltavka (the district's administrative centre) by road. Gmelinka is the nearest rural locality.

References 

Rural localities in Staropoltavsky District